Bossiaea ensata, commonly known as sword bossiaea, is a species of flowering plant in the family Fabaceae and is endemic to south-eastern continental Australia. It is an erect or low-lying, glabrous shrub with flattened branches, flattened, winged cladodes, leaves mostly reduced to small scales, and orange-yellow and red flowers.

Description
The standard petal is yellow with a red base and with red streaks or blotches on the back. The wings are yellow, sometimes with a red tinge and the keel pale greenish yellow.

Taxonomy
Bossiaea ensata was first formally described in 1825 by Augustin Pyramus de Candolle in Prodromus Systematis Naturalis Regni Vegetabilis from an unpublished description by Franz Sieber. The specific epithet (ensata) means "sword-shaped", referring to the flattened stems.

Distribution and habitat
Sword bossiaea usually grows in sandy heath and is found on the coast and nearby tablelands of south-east Queensland, New South Wales and Victoria as far west as Marlo. There is also a record from the south of South Australia.

References

ensata
Mirbelioids
Flora of New South Wales
Flora of Queensland
Flora of South Australia
Flora of Victoria (Australia)
Taxa named by Augustin Pyramus de Candolle
Plants described in 1825